Corabelle Lake is a lake in Murray County, in the U.S. state of Minnesota.

Corabelle Lake was named for the daughter of a local hotel owner.

References

Lakes of Minnesota
Lakes of Murray County, Minnesota